The 2022–23 Serbian Cup season is the seventeenth season of the Serbian national football cup competition. It started on 14 September 2022, and will end on 3 June 2023.

Match times up to 30 October 2022 and from 26 March 2023 were CEST (UTC+2). Times on interim ("winter") days were CET (UTC+1).

Calendar

Preliminary round 
A preliminary round was held in order to reduce the number of teams competing in the first round to 32. It consisted of 4 single-legged ties, with a penalty shoot-out as the decider if the score was tied after 90 minutes. 8 clubs are participating in the preliminary round - four winners of the cups of territorial associations and teams that were from 13th to 16th place in the previous season of the Serbian First League.

Round of 32 
Draw for the first round took place on 19 September 2022. Matches were played on 19 October 2022. It consisted of 16 single-legged ties, with a penalty shoot-out as the decider if the score was tied after 90 minutes.

Round of 16 
Draw for the second round took place on 3 November 2022. Matches were played on 9 November 2022. It consisted of 8 single-legged ties, with a penalty shoot-out as the decider if the score was tied after 90 minutes.

Quarter-finals

Semi-finals

Final

Top goalscorers 
As of matches played on 15 March 2023.

References

External links 
 Official site

Serbian Cup seasons
Cup
Serbian Cup